St. Hovhannes Church was an Armenian church located on a hill in the center of the former village of Berdak, near the current Dyrnys village (Ordubad district) of the Nakhchivan Autonomous Republic of Azerbaijan.

History 
The date of the construction of the church is unclear, however, the date 1625 appeared on a few cross-stones (khachkars) that were embedded in the church walls. An Armenian inscription in the church attests to renovations in 1888.

Architectural characteristics 
The church was a small, vaulted building with a single-chamber nave, an apse in the east and a single doorway in the southern facade. A hall built along the southern facade may have served as a vestry or bell tower. Armenian inscriptions were set in the eastern and southern walls.

Destruction 
The church was still standing in the early 1980s. However, it was partially ruined at that time. According to investigation of the Caucasus Heritage Watch, the church was destroyed by February 3, 2000, it remained a vacant plot until 2019 when the Allahshukur Mosque was built on the grounds of the former church. The mosque was built in honor of the Sheikh ul-Islam and Grand Mufti of the Caucasus, Allahshukur Pashazadeh.

References 

Armenian churches in Azerbaijan
Ruins in Azerbaijan